Bikheh Deraz (also Romanized as Bīkheh Derāz; also known as Bīkhderāz) is a village in Fasarud Rural District, in the Central District of Darab County, Fars Province, Iran. At the 2006 census, its population was 37 consisting of 5 families.

References 

Populated places in Darab County